Felsted is a village in north-west Essex, England.

Felsted may also refer to:

 , Aabenraa Municipality
 Felsted Records
 Felsted School
 Felsted railway station

See also 
 Felstead (disambiguation)